Yousef Abdelrahman (Arabic:يوسف عبد الرحمن; born 10 August 2000) is an Emirati footballer. He currently plays as a midfielder for Ittihad Kalba.

Career
Yousef Abdelrahman started his career at Ittihad Kalba and is a product of the Ittihad Kalba's youth system. On 7 November 2019, Yousef Abdelrahman made his professional debut for Ittihad Kalba against Al-Nasr in the Pro League, replacing Yaqoub Al Hosani .

References

External links
 

2000 births
Living people
Emirati footballers
Al-Ittihad Kalba SC players
UAE Pro League players
Association football midfielders
Place of birth missing (living people)